Gear.Club Unlimited is a racing video game developed by Eden Games and published by Microïds for the Nintendo Switch. It was released on November 21, 2017 in North America, in Europe on December 1, 2017, and in Japan on December 14, 2017. It is an expanded version of the iOS/Android mobile game Gear.Club.

A sequel, Gear.Club Unlimited 2, was announced in 2018. It was released on December 4, 2018 for the Nintendo Switch, as well as the Ultimate Edition on November 30, 2021 for the PlayStation 4, PlayStation 5, Xbox One, Xbox Series X/S, and Microsoft Windows.

Gameplay 
Gear.Club Unlimited is a racing video game where the player controls a car to race it from the starting line to the finish line. The game has 32 cars, divided into 4 classes, A, B, C, D, which are in turn divided into multiple sub-groups. The game starts off where the player is lent a McLaren 570S to test out the controls and gameplay. With enough money to buy a Nissan 370Z or a Chevrolet Camaro 1LS. The player starts off in the lowest championships and starts racing to get enough stars to unlock new zones in the game's map, which represents Southern Europe. There are three types of racing, Race, Rally and Time attack. The game also has a "rewind" feature that can be used if a mistake is made, enabling the player to effectively turn back time and try to recover from their errors.

The game has 32 cars including the W Motors Lykan Hypersport, the Acura NSX, the McLaren P1, the Pagani Huayra Roadster, the Ford Mustang GT, the AC 378 GT Zagato and more.

Development 
The game started development in late 2014 when Eden Games became an independent games studio free of Atari.

In June 2017, publisher Microïds announced a line-up of games they were releasing for the Nintendo Switch, one of which was believed as a port of the mobile game Gear.Club. In early August 2017, Microïds revealed via Nintendo Life that the title is in fact  Gear.Club Unlimited, which is an expansion to the free-to-play mobile game with additional cars and modes. Later that month, Microïds confirmed a 1 December 2017 release date, although they later clarified in October the December release date only applies to Europe, and announced the game will release in North America on 24 November 2017, with a limited physical release exclusive to GameStop. Prior to the game's launch, Eden Games collaborated with DriveTribe for a giveaway to its members, whom were eligible to receive a limited quantity code that allowed them to unlock the Chevrolet Camaro 50th Anniversary car in the game.

In an interview with Red Bull, developer Eden Games clarified that Gear.Club Unlimited, unlike its free-to-play mobile predecessor Gear.Club, is a full premium title and has no microtransactions. They added that the game capitalises on the Nintendo Switch's power and attributes, stating the graphical fidelity will be 1080p at a steady 30 fps in docked mode, and that the game supports splitscreen local multiplayer with up to four players using a single Joy-Con controller. There are also plans for future downloadable content.

Reception 
The game received "mixed or average reviews" on Metacritic with a score of 64. It was consistently praised for its graphics, gameplay and lack of microtransactions, but criticised for its short and repetitive races and its weak AI.

References

External links 
 
 Gear.Club Unlimited on nintendo.com

2017 video games
Eden Games games
Microïds games
Multiplayer and single-player video games
Nintendo Switch games
Nintendo Switch-only games
Racing video games
Video games developed in France